Traversa is an Italian surname. Notable people with the surname include:

Alejandro Traversa (born 1974), Uruguayan footballer
Fabio Traversa (born 1952), Italian actor
Lucia Traversa (born 1965), Italian fencer
Martino Traversa (born 1960), Italian composer
Tito Traversa (2001–2013), Italian mountain climber
Tommaso Traversa (born 1990), Italian ice hockey player

See also
5651 Traversa, main-belt asteroid

Italian-language surnames